This is a list of notable educational video games. 

There is some overlap between educational games and interactive CD-ROMs and other programs (based on player agency), and between educational games and related genres like simulations and interactive storybooks (based on how much gameplay is devoted to education). This list aims to list games which have been marketed as educational.

Often, educational video game properties become part of larger franchises, for example Carmen Sandiego, Oregon Trail, and Math Blaster.

Educational games for children and adolescent

Educational games for adults

References

Video games
 
Educational